Adélaïde Binart (9 March 1769 – September 1832) was a French neoclassical painter-artist.

Adélaïde Binart was born 9 March 1769, in Paris.
She exhibited her works, mostly portraits, at the Salon of 1795–1817. In 1794, she married Alexandre Lenoir, with whom she has three children: Zelia (1795–1813), Albert (1801–1891) and Clodomir (1804–1887). Her studio was located in the former convent of the Petits-Augustins. There are three known portraits of her: at age 27 by Marie Bouliard (1796, Paris, Musée Carnavalet), at age 30 by the artist Pierre-Maximilien Delafontaine, where she is in the company of her husband and daughter, and at age 40 (1809) by Jacques-Louis David. She died in Paris in September, 1832.

Selected works 

 1795, Tête d'étude
 1799, Portrait du citoyen Gauthier de Claubri
 1799, Portrait d'une jeune personne
 1799, Portrait du citoyen Sage
 1800, Portrait du citoyen P. Claude Binart
 1801, Une dame assise avec ses enfants
 1804, Euterpe 
 1808, Portrait de M. Dupuis
 1816, Portrait de Mme Pasté et Mme Rey sa fille 
 1816, Portrait de Zélia, à 18 ans
 1817, Portrait en pied d'un enfant de 4 ans
 1817. Portrait de feu M. Collineau-Peltereau
 Portrait de M. Foubert
 Portrait de M. Happey
 Portrait de M. Dufour père
 Portrait de M. Coste
 Portrait de M. Champein
 Portrait de Mmes Julie et Rose de Frenays
 Portrait de Mme Duplantys
 Portrait de Mme Laugier
 Portrait de M. Viette

Sources
  (in French)
 Hérissant Le Doux, Explication des ouvrages de peinture, sculpture, architecture, gravure, exposés au Musée royal des arts, le 24 avril 1817. Paris : Impr. de Madame Hérissant Le Doux, imprimeur ordinaire du roi et des Musées royaux, 1817 (in French)
 Émile Bellier de La Chavignerie, 1882–1885, Dictionnaire général des artistes de l'École française depuis l'origine des arts du dessin jusqu'à nos jours : architectes, peintres, sculpteurs, graveurs et lithographes. Librairie Renouard (Paris) (in French)

External links

1769 births
1832 deaths
French neoclassical painters
Painters from Paris
18th-century French painters
19th-century French painters
French portrait painters
French women painters
19th-century French women artists
18th-century French women artists